The 1985–86 NBA season was the Bullets 25th season in the NBA and their 13th season in the city of Washington, D.C.

Draft picks

Roster

Regular season

Season standings

Notes
 z, y – division champions
 x – clinched playoff spot

Record vs. opponents

Game log

Regular season

|- align="center" bgcolor="#ccffcc"
| 1
| October 25, 19857:30p.m. EDT
| @ Atlanta
| W 100–91
| Robinson (22)
| Ruland (14)
| Ruland (9)
| The Omni10,129
| 1–0
|- align="center" bgcolor="#ccffcc"
| 2
| October 29, 1985
| @ Cleveland
| W 97–90
|
|
|
| Richfield Coliseum
| 2–0
|- align="center" bgcolor="#ffcccc"
| 3
| October 31, 1985
| Cleveland
| L 107–114
|
|
|
| Capital Centre
| 2–1

|- align="center" bgcolor="#ffcccc"
| 4
| November 2, 1985
| Boston
| L 73–88
|
|
|
| Capital Centre
| 2–2
|- align="center" bgcolor="#ffcccc"
| 5
| November 5, 1985
| @ New Jersey
| L 106–112
|
|
|
| Brendan Byrne Arena
| 2–3
|- align="center" bgcolor="#ffcccc"
| 6
| November 6, 1985
| San Antonio
| L 80–81
|
|
|
| Capital Centre
| 2–4
|- align="center" bgcolor="#ffcccc"
| 7
| November 8, 1985
| Detroit
| L 110–117
|
|
|
| Capital Centre
| 2–5
|- align="center" bgcolor="#ffcccc"
| 8
| November 12, 1985
| @ Detroit
| L 122–124 (OT)
|
|
|
| Pontiac Silverdome
| 2–6
|- align="center" bgcolor="#ffcccc"
| 9
| November 15, 1985
| @ Boston
| L 114–118
|
|
|
| Boston Garden
| 2–7
|- align="center" bgcolor="#ccffcc"
| 10
| November 16, 1985
| Philadelphia
| W 118–97
|
|
|
| Capital Centre
| 3–7
|- align="center" bgcolor="#ffcccc"
| 11
| November 19, 1985
| @ New York
| L 94–98
|
|
|
| Madison Square Garden
| 3–8
|- align="center" bgcolor="#ccffcc"
| 12
| November 20, 1985
| Cleveland
| W 101–98
|
|
|
| Capital Centre
| 4–8
|- align="center" bgcolor="#ccffcc"
| 13
| November 22, 1985
| New York
| W 102–94
|
|
|
| Capital Centre
| 5–8
|- align="center" bgcolor="#ccffcc"
| 14
| November 24, 1985
| Chicago
| W 115–106
|
|
|
| Capital Centre
| 6–8
|- align="center" bgcolor="#ffcccc"
| 15
| November 26, 1985
| @ Dallas
| L 99–112
|
|
|
| Reunion Arena
| 6–9
|- align="center" bgcolor="#ffcccc"
| 16
| November 27, 1985
| @ San Antonio
| L 97–104
|
|
|
| HemisFair Arena
| 6–10
|- align="center" bgcolor="#ccffcc"
| 17
| November 30, 1985
| Detroit
| W 133–119
|
|
|
| Capital Centre
| 7–10

|- align="center" bgcolor="#ccffcc"
| 18
| December 3, 1985
| Portland
| W 118–115
|
|
|
| Capital Centre
| 8–10
|- align="center" bgcolor="#ffcccc"
| 19
| December 4, 1985
| @ Philadelphia
| L 110–115 (OT)
|
|
|
| The Spectrum
| 8–11
|- align="center" bgcolor="#ccffcc"
| 20
| December 6, 1985
| Seattle
| W 115–109
|
|
|
| Capital Centre
| 9–11
|- align="center" bgcolor="#ccffcc"
| 21
| December 8, 1985
| Sacramento
| W 111–89
|
|
|
| Capital Centre
| 10–11
|- align="center" bgcolor="#ccffcc"
| 22
| December 11, 1985
| @ Detroit
| W 108–100
|
|
|
| Pontiac Silverdome
| 11–11
|- align="center" bgcolor="#ccffcc"
| 23
| December 12, 1985
| Milwaukee
| W 110–108 (OT)
|
|
|
| Capital Centre
| 12–11
|- align="center" bgcolor="#ffcccc"
| 24
| December 17, 1985
| Utah
| L 98–106
|
|
|
| Capital Centre
| 12–12
|- align="center" bgcolor="#ccffcc"
| 25
| December 19, 1985
| @ Chicago
| W 98–92
|
|
|
| Chicago Stadium
| 13–12
|- align="center" bgcolor="#ffcccc"
| 26
| December 21, 1985
| L.A. Lakers
| L 84–96
|
|
|
| Capital Centre
| 13–13
|- align="center" bgcolor="#ffcccc"
| 27
| December 22, 1985
| New York
| L 93–100
|
|
|
| Capital Centre
| 13–14
|- align="center" bgcolor="#ccffcc"
| 28
| December 27, 19857:30p.m. EST
| Atlanta
| W 111–109
| Malone (31)
| Roundfield (8)
| Johnson (7)
| Capital Centre8,178
| 14–14
|- align="center" bgcolor="#ccffcc"
| 29
| December 28, 1985
| @ New Jersey
| W 98–93
|
|
|
| Brendan Byrne Arena
| 15–14
|- align="center" bgcolor="#ffcccc"
| 30
| December 30, 1985
| Indiana
| L 80–97
|
|
|
| Capital Centre
| 15–15

|- align="center" bgcolor="#ccffcc"
| 31
| January 2, 1986
| @ New York
| W 115–109
|
|
|
| Madison Square Garden
| 16–15
|- align="center" bgcolor="#ffcccc"
| 32
| January 3, 1986
| Milwaukee
| L 100–107
|
|
|
| Capital Centre
| 16–16
|- align="center" bgcolor="#ffcccc"
| 33
| January 5, 1986
| @ L.A. Lakers
| L 88–118
|
|
|
| The Forum
| 16–17
|- align="center" bgcolor="#ffcccc"
| 34
| January 6, 1986
| @ Sacramento
| L 87–106
|
|
|
| ARCO Arena
| 16–18
|- align="center" bgcolor="#ffcccc"
| 35
| January 8, 1986
| @ Phoenix
| L 97–109
|
|
|
| Arizona Veterans Memorial Coliseum
| 16–19
|- align="center" bgcolor="#ccffcc"
| 36
| January 9, 1986
| @ Utah
| W 95–89
|
|
|
| Salt Palace Acord Arena
| 17–19
|- align="center" bgcolor="#ffcccc"
| 37
| January 11, 1986
| @ Houston
| L 86–87
|
|
|
| The Summit
| 17–20
|- align="center" bgcolor="#ccffcc"
| 38
| January 13, 1986
| L.A. Clippers
| W 90–77
|
|
|
| Capital Centre
| 18–20
|- align="center" bgcolor="#ccffcc"
| 39
| January 14, 1986
| @ Chicago
| W 117–113
|
|
|
| Chicago Stadium
| 19–20
|- align="center" bgcolor="#ffcccc"
| 40
| January 16, 1986
| @ Milwaukee
| L 98–114
|
|
|
| MECCA Arena
| 19–21
|- align="center" bgcolor="#ccffcc"
| 41
| January 17, 1986
| New Jersey
| W 116–96
|
|
|
| Capital Centre
| 20–21
|- align="center" bgcolor="#ccffcc"
| 42
| January 19, 1986
| Chicago
| W 112–98
|
|
|
| Capital Centre
| 21–21
|- align="center" bgcolor="#ccffcc"
| 43
| January 23, 1986
| Phoenix
| W 114–112
|
|
|
| Capital Centre
| 22–21
|- align="center" bgcolor="#ccffcc"
| 44
| January 25, 19867:30p.m. EST
| Atlanta
| W 111–103
| Robinson (38)
| Robinson (11)
| Williams (6)
| Capital Centre7,038
| 23–21
|- align="center" bgcolor="#ffcccc"
| 45
| January 29, 1986
| @ Indiana
| L 88–92
|
|
|
| Market Square Arena
| 23–22
|- align="center" bgcolor="#ffcccc"
| 46
| January 31, 1986
| Boston
| L 88–97
|
|
|
| Capital Centre
| 23–23

|- align="center" bgcolor="#ffcccc"
| 47
| February 1, 1986
| @ Detroit
| L 101–116
|
|
|
| Pontiac Silverdome
| 23–24
|- align="center" bgcolor="#ffcccc"
| 48
| February 5, 1986
| @ Boston
| L 88–103
|
|
|
| Boston Garden
| 23–25
|- align="center" bgcolor="#ffcccc"
| 49
| February 6, 1986
| Detroit
| L 109–111 (OT)
|
|
|
| Capital Centre
| 23–26
|- align="center"
|colspan="9" bgcolor="#bbcaff"|All-Star Break
|- style="background:#cfc;"
|- bgcolor="#bbffbb"
|- align="center" bgcolor="#ccffcc"
| 50
| February 11, 1986
| @ Portland
| W 124–116
|
|
|
| Memorial Coliseum
| 24–26
|- align="center" bgcolor="#ffcccc"
| 51
| February 13, 1986
| @ Golden State
| L 105–109
|
|
|
| Oakland–Alameda County Coliseum Arena
| 24–27
|- align="center" bgcolor="#ffcccc"
| 52
| February 15, 1986
| @ Seattle
| L 106–112
|
|
|
| Seattle Center Coliseum
| 24–28
|- align="center" bgcolor="#ccffcc"
| 53
| February 17, 1986
| @ L.A. Clippers
| W 96–94
|
|
|
| Los Angeles Memorial Sports Arena
| 25–28
|- align="center" bgcolor="#ffcccc"
| 54
| February 18, 1986
| @ Denver
| L 90–101
|
|
|
| McNichols Sports Arena
| 25–29
|- align="center" bgcolor="#ffcccc"
| 55
| February 21, 1986
| @ Philadelphia
| L 87–97
|
|
|
| The Spectrum
| 25–30
|- align="center" bgcolor="#ccffcc"
| 56
| February 22, 1986
| @ Cleveland
| W 110–102
|
|
|
| Richfield Coliseum
| 26–30
|- align="center" bgcolor="#ccffcc"
| 57
| February 24, 1986
| New Jersey
| W 99–89
|
|
|
| Capital Centre
| 27–30
|- align="center" bgcolor="#ffcccc"
| 58
| February 25, 1986
| @ Indiana
| L 87–100
|
|
|
| Market Square Arena
| 27–31
|- align="center" bgcolor="#ccffcc"
| 59
| February 27, 1986
| Golden State
| W 114–102
|
|
|
| Capital Centre
| 28–31
|- align="center" bgcolor="#ffcccc"
| 60
| February 28, 1986
| @ Milwaukee
| L 84–102
|
|
|
| MECCA Arena
| 28–32

|- align="center" bgcolor="#ccffcc"
| 61
| March 2, 1986
| Milwaukee
| W 125–104
|
|
|
| Capital Centre
| 29–32
|- align="center" bgcolor="#ffcccc"
| 62
| March 4, 1986
| @ New York
| L 83–119
|
|
|
| Madison Square Garden
| 29–33
|- align="center" bgcolor="#ccffcc"
| 63
| March 6, 1986
| New York
| W 113–111 (OT)
|
|
|
| Capital Centre
| 30–33
|- align="center" bgcolor="#ccffcc"
| 64
| March 8, 1986
| Boston
| W 110–108 (OT)
|
|
|
| Capital Centre
| 31–33
|- align="center" bgcolor="#ccffcc"
| 65
| March 12, 1986
| @ Cleveland
| W 128–114
|
|
|
| Richfield Coliseum
| 32–33
|- align="center" bgcolor="#ffcccc"
| 66
| March 14, 1986
| Denver
| L 91–101
|
|
|
| Capital Centre
| 32–34
|- align="center" bgcolor="#ffcccc"
| 67
| March 15, 1986
| @ Indiana
| L 100–105
|
|
|
| Market Square Arena
| 32–35
|- align="center" bgcolor="#ffcccc"
| 68
| March 17, 1986
| New Jersey
| L 102–130
|
|
|
| Capital Centre
| 32–36
|- align="center" bgcolor="#ffcccc"
| 69
| March 18, 1986
| @ Milwaukee
| L 87–116
|
|
|
| MECCA Arena
| 32–37
|- align="center" bgcolor="#ffcccc"
| 70
| March 21, 1986
| @ Philadelphia
| L 105–112
|
|
|
| The Spectrum
| 32–38
|- align="center" bgcolor="#ccffcc"
| 71
| March 22, 1986
| Indiana
| W 111–110
|
|
|
| Capital Centre
| 33–38
|- align="center" bgcolor="#ccffcc"
| 72
| March 24, 1986
| Philadelphia
| W 100–93
|
|
|
| Capital Centre
| 34–38
|- align="center" bgcolor="#ccffcc"
| 73
| March 26, 1986
| Dallas
| W 120–112
|
|
|
| Capital Centre
| 35–38
|- align="center" bgcolor="#ffcccc"
| 74
| March 28, 1986
| @ Boston
| L 97–116
|
|
|
| Boston Garden
| 35–39
|- align="center" bgcolor="#ffcccc"
| 75
| March 29, 1986
| Houston
| L 109–114
|
|
|
| Capital Centre
| 35–40

|- align="center" bgcolor="#ffcccc"
| 76
| April 1, 19867:30p.m. EST
| @ Atlanta
| L 91–107
| Malone (32)
| Robinson (10)
| Malone, Williams (5)
| The Omni6,835
| 35–41
|- align="center" bgcolor="#ccffcc"
| 77
| April 3, 1986
| @ New Jersey
| W 120–108
|
|
|
| Brendan Byrne Arena
| 36–41
|- align="center" bgcolor="#ccffcc"
| 78
| April 4, 19867:30p.m. EST
| Atlanta
| W 135–129 (OT)
| Robinson (31)
| Roundfield (16)
| Williams (15)
| Capital Centre9,113
| 37–41
|- align="center" bgcolor="#ccffcc"
| 79
| April 6, 1986
| Cleveland
| W 106–95
|
|
|
| Capital Centre
| 38–41
|- align="center" bgcolor="#ffcccc"
| 80
| April 8, 1986
| Indiana
| L 104–111
|
|
|
| Capital Centre
| 38–42
|- align="center" bgcolor="#ffcccc"
| 81
| April 11, 1986
| @ Chicago
| L 103–105
|
|
|
| Chicago Stadium
| 38–43
|- align="center" bgcolor="#ccffcc"
| 82
| April 13, 1986
| Philadelphia
| W 98–97
|
|
|
| Capital Centre
| 39–43

Playoffs

|- align="center" bgcolor="#ccffcc"
| 1
| April 18, 1986
| @ Philadelphia
| W 95–94
| Jeff Malone (21)
| Cliff Robinson (8)
| Gus Williams (7)
| Spectrum9,148
| 1–0
|- align="center" bgcolor="#ffcccc"
| 2
| April 20, 1986
| @ Philadelphia
| L 97–102
| Jeff Malone (25)
| Cliff Robinson (11)
| Gus Williams (12)
| Spectrum9,057
| 1–1
|- align="center" bgcolor="#ffcccc"
| 3
| April 22, 1986
| Philadelphia
| L 86–91
| Gus Williams (28)
| Bol, Roundfield (10)
| Williams, Roundfield (4)
| Capital Centre17,137
| 1–2
|- align="center" bgcolor="#ccffcc"
| 4
| April 24, 1986
| Philadelphia
| W 116–111
| Cliff Robinson (31)
| Manute Bol (12)
| Jeff Ruland (5)
| Capital Centre12,588
| 2–2
|- align="center" bgcolor="#ffcccc"
| 5
| April 27, 1986
| @ Philadelphia
| L 109–134
| Cliff Robinson (30)
| Cliff Robinson (11)
| Gus Williams (6)
| Spectrum15,162
| 2–3
|-

Player statistics

Season

Playoffs

Awards and records
 Manute Bol, NBA All-Defensive Second Team

Transactions

See also
 1985–86 NBA season

References

Washington Wizards seasons
Wash
Washing
Washing